Kelly Sutherland (born April 18, 1971, in Richmond, British Columbia) is a National Hockey League referee who wears uniform number 11.

Career 
Sutherland was one of the referees for the 2010 Stanley Cup Finals along Bill McCreary, Dan O'Halloran, and Stephen Walkom. He was selected again to officiate the 2011 Stanley Cup Finals, the 2015 Stanley Cup Finals, 2016 Stanley Cup Finals, 2018 Stanley Cup Finals, 2019 Stanley Cup Finals, 2020 Stanley Cup Finals and the 2022 Stanley Cup Finals. Sutherland officiated the gold medal game men's ice hockey tournament at the 2014 Winter Olympics in Sochi.

References

1971 births
Canadian ice hockey officials
Living people
National Hockey League officials
People from Richmond, British Columbia